The Ministry of Culture of the Republic of Serbia is the ministry in the Government of Serbia which is in the charge of culture and information. The current minister is Maja Gojković, in office since 28 October 2020.

History
The Ministry of Culture was established on 11 February 1991.

The Ministry of Information was merged into the Ministry of Culture in 2001.

The Ministry of Telecommunications and Information Society was merged into the Ministry of Culture, Information, and Informational Society in 2011. The Ministry of Religion and Diaspora which existed from 1991 to 2012, merged into the Ministry of Culture, Information, and Diaspora in 2012. Also, some of the jurisdictions of the Ministry were passed to the reestablished Ministry of Internal and Foreign Trade, Telecommunications, and Information Society in 2012. Ministry was once again renamed in 2022.

List of ministers
Political Party:

See also
 Ministry of Religion and Diaspora (Serbia)
 Ministry of Information (Serbia)
 Ministry of Religion (Serbia)
 Serbian culture
 Serbian diaspora
 Religion in Serbia

References

External links
 
 Serbian ministries, etc – Rulers.org

Culture
1991 establishments in Serbia
Ministries established in 1991
Serbia